The surname Lash may refer to:

 Cody Lash, American alloy pourer
 Batton Lash, American comic book creator
 Dominic Lash, English musician
 Don Lash (1912–1994), American long-distance runner
 Israel G. Lash (1810–1878), American politician
 Jennifer Lash (1938–1993), English novelist and painter
 Jim Lash (born 1951), American football player
 Nicholas Lash (1934–2020), English theologian
 Scott Lash, American professor of sociology and cultural studies
 Tony Lash, American musician and music producer
 Trude Lash (1908–2004), German-American student activist
 William H. Lash (1961–2006), American political officer and professor
 William Quinlan Lash, English bishop
 Mario Hernandez Lash, Mexican retired footballer